James Mansfield "Moose" Malmquist (July 18, 1931 – August 17, 2016)
was an American football and ice hockey coach. He served as the head football coach at Texas Lutheran University in Seguin, Texasfrom 1959 to 1961, Augustana College—now known as Augustana University—in Sioux Falls, South Dakota from 1962 to 1968, and Bemidji State University in Bemidji, Minnesota from 1969 to 1973, compiling a career college football coaching record of 49–81–5. He was also the head ice hockey coach at Gustavus Adolphus College in St. Peter, Minnesota from 1956 to 1959, tallying a mark of 18–21.

Head coaching record

References

1931 births
2016 deaths
American football fullbacks
Augustana (South Dakota) Vikings football coaches
Bemidji State Beavers football coaches
Gustavus Adolphus Golden Gusties athletic directors
Gustavus Adolphus Golden Gusties football coaches
Gustavus Adolphus Golden Gusties football players
Gustavus Adolphus Golden Gusties men's ice hockey coaches
Texas Lutheran Bulldogs football coaches
People from Brainerd, Minnesota
Players of American football from Minnesota